Lesley (Welch) Lehane (born March 12, 1963, in Lynn, MA) is an American retired long-distance runner.

High school career

Lehane graduated from Peabody Veterans Memorial High School class of 1981, winning back to back to back cross country individual state titles from her sophomore through senior years. Her best times on the track in high school include a 9:27 3000 meter run and a 34:48 10,000 meter run.

College and professional career

Lehane attended University of Virginia for two years, and subsequently transferred to Boston University. Her career highlights in cross country include winning both the NCAA and TAC National Championships in 1982, a 5th-place finish at the 1987 IAAF World Cross Country Championships, and a repeat as TAC National Championship winner in 1986. While at Virginia, she won the Broderick Award (now the Honda Sports Award) as the nation's top female collegiate cross country runner in 1982–83. Her career bests times are 4:08 1500 meters, 4:30 mile, 5:37 2000 meters, 8:44 3000 meters, 15:14 5000 meters on the road (15:19 on the track), 25:37 5 mile run, 31:42 10,000 meters, 53:04 10 mile run, and a 2-hour 32 minute marathon. Her identical twin sister Lisa Brady was also a competitive distance runner, who ran a 2-hour-34-minute marathon, placing sixth at the Boston Marathon.

Achievements

All results regarding marathon, unless stated otherwise

References

 

1963 births
Living people
Track and field athletes from Massachusetts
American female long-distance runners
American female cross country runners
Goodwill Games medalists in athletics
Competitors at the 1998 Goodwill Games
21st-century American women